Machavariani Mikhail Sergeevich, (Russian: Мачавариани Михаил Сергеевич) Russian Imperial Army Airforce pilot, colonel

He was born on March 20, 1888, Kutaisi, Georgia. Served in Russian Empire military airforce as a pilot. In 1910 he graduated from the Konstantinovsky Artillery School in St.Petersburg and joined the 39th Artillery Brigade. In 1913, on the basis of a personal report sent to the fortress of Kars aviation detachment to the position of the pilot - observer.

In November 1913 he applied for the military flying school in Gatchina, Russia and in May 1914 began to practice at the Gatchina airfield. After school, with the rank of a military pilot was assigned to the 3rd Aviation company, located in the city of Lida Vilnenskoy province.

On August 15 of 1914 he was assigned to the 10th Army Aviation Detachment at the 1st Army Gen. Rennenkampf standing in Verzhblovo.

In January 1916 he was transferred to the Caucasian front. Since the summer of 1916 he was the commander of the 2nd Air Force unit of the Caucasus Front. During a critical mission, he personally shot down two Turkish airplanes and was awarded the Order of St. George, the highest purely military decoration of the Imperial Russian Army and the Russian Federation.

In 1929, discharged from the military aviation due to health issue with a personal pension. After retirement from military held various senior positions in the Georgian government.

References

1888 births
Aviators from the Russian Empire
Year of death missing